Live en studio is the fourth album by québécois comedy duo Crampe en masse, and the first on their own label Les disques Crampe en masse.

Track listing

All tracks written by Crampe en masse (Mathieu Gratton and Ghyslain Dufresne).

2001 albums
Crampe en masse albums
2000s comedy albums